Maarssen is a town in the middle of the Netherlands, in the province of Utrecht, along the river Vecht and the Amsterdam–Rhine Canal. The west of Maarssen is called Maarssen-Broek whereas the east is called Maarssen-Dorp. Both put together and joined by other small towns around provide the area of Maarssen.

On 1 January 2011 Maarssen merged with the councils of Breukelen and Loenen to become Stichtse Vecht.

Population centres 
The former municipality of Maarssen consisted of the following cities, towns, villages and/or districts:
 Maarssen (colloquially "Maarssen-dorp") and Maarssen-Broek
 Maarssenbroek
 Maarsseveen
 Molenpolder
 Oud-Maarsseveen
 Oud-Zuilen
 Tienhoven

Transportation 
 Maarssen railway station

References

External links 
 
 
 Historische Kring Maarssen
 Maarssen 2000

Municipalities of the Netherlands disestablished in 2011
Populated places in Utrecht (province)
Former municipalities of Utrecht (province)
Stichtse Vecht